Wdzydze Landscape Park (Wdzydzki Park Krajobrazowy) is a protected area (Landscape Park) in northern Poland, established in 1983, covering an area of .

The Park lies within Pomeranian Voivodeship, in Kościerzyna County (Gmina Dziemiany, Gmina Karsin, Gmina Kościerzyna, Gmina Lipusz, Gmina Stara Kiszewa).

The Park (together with the Tuchola, Wda and Zaborski Landscape Parks) forms the buffer zone of the Tuchola Forest Biosphere Reserve, designated under the UNESCO Man and the Biosphere Programme in 2010. The core area of the Biosphere Reserve consists of Tuchola Forest National Park and the nature reserves lying within the Landscape Parks of the buffer zone.

References

Wdydze
Parks in Pomeranian Voivodeship
Kościerzyna County